Leslie Controls, Inc., part of the Thermal Fluid Division of Circor International Inc., is a manufacturer of industrial water heaters, control systems and regulators headquartered in Tampa, Florida. It is one of two major manufacturers of train horns in North America, the other being Nathan Manufacturing, Inc.

Products and services
In addition to air horns, Leslie Controls manufactures control valves, shutoff valves, control instrumentation, steam conditioning systems, steam water heaters and regulators. Leslie has a service center located in Tampa, which remanufacture valves made by a number of major companies. Other service centers repair valves from Watts ACV, R.G. Laurence, K&M, Contromatics, and Chas M. Bailey.

History
Canadian John Leslie made a steam powered snowplow for railroads. By 1905, Leslie was operating a foundry in Lyndhurst, New Jersey and making steam pressure valves and regulators. During World War I and World War II, Leslie supplied military and merchant ships with steam control equipment.

In 1968, after the company had expanded its product line to include industries and utilities, Leslie built a plant in Parsippany, New Jersey.

Leslie moved to Tampa and was purchased in 1990 by Watts Industries, Inc. Leslie bought K&M Valve Company in 1995.

Watts started Circor International in 1999 when it spun off valve and control businesses relating to oil and gas.

On November 16, 2021, HornBlasters announced that they had acquired the Prestigious Air Whistles Division of Circor Leslie Controls, the oldest locomotive horn manufacturer in the United States. As a result, Circor Leslie Controls' horns, including its Supertyfon RS horn, will be sold by HornBlasters starting in 2021.

References

External links
Leslie Controls website

Manufacturing companies based in Florida